Ines Khouildi (born 11 March 1985) is a Tunisian handball player for Thüringer HC and the Tunisian national team.

She was part of the Tunisian team at the 2015 World Women's Handball Championship.

References

1985 births
Living people
Tunisian female handball players
Expatriate handball players in Poland
Expatriate handball players in Turkey
Tunisian expatriate sportspeople in France
Tunisian expatriate sportspeople in Poland
Tunisian expatriate sportspeople in Romania
Tunisian expatriate sportspeople in Germany
Tunisian expatriate sportspeople in Turkey
Muratpaşa Bld. SK (women's handball) players